Bodily Harm is a 1995 thriller film directed by James Lemmo and starring Linda Fiorentino and Daniel Baldwin. It was edited by Carl Kress, and has music by Robert Sprayberry and cinematography by Doyle Smith. It set in Las Vegas, Nevada. The film was rated R and was distributed by Warner Vision Entertainment and internationally by Rysher Entertainment.

Premise
When a striptease dancer is brutally murdered in Las Vegas, detective Rita Cates and her partner, J.D. Prejon, are assigned to the case. There is not much evidence available, but what they have points to Sam McKeon, an ex-cop. This puts Rita in a difficult position, because she and Sam previously had a scalding affair, which ultimately led to her husband's suicide. They have not spoken since then, but Rita could never get Sam out of her mind. During the investigation, they resume their affair, although Rita is constantly torn between trust and distrust, and attempting to keep an open mind. Eventually she has to choose, knowing that the wrong choice may get her killed.

Cast
 Linda Fiorentino as Rita Cates
 Daniel Baldwin as Sam McKeon
 Gregg Henry as JD Prejon
 Bill Smitrovich as Lt Darryl Stewart
 Troy Evans as Oscar Simpson
 Joe Regalbuto as Stan Geffen
 Millie Perkins as Dr. Spencer
 Shannon Kenny as Jacy Barclay / Krystal Lynn
 Todd Susman as Jerry Roth
 William Utay as Frangipani
 Ken Lerner as Alex Shaw
 Casey Biggs as Michael Cates

Release
Bodily Harm was released in theatres in 1995. The film was released on VHS on November 21, 1995, by Warner Home Video.

References

Citations

Sources

External links

1995 films
American thriller films
1995 thriller films
1990s English-language films
Films directed by James Lemmo
1990s American films